Sinking Springs Farms is a historic farm and national historic district located at Manchester Township in York County, Pennsylvania. The district includes 32 contributing buildings, 2 contributing sites, and 17 contributing structures. The district includes the Manor House Demesne, four farmsteads, and a Radio Broadcast Complex. The manor house dates to 1900, and is a -story, Colonial Revival-style dwelling modified between 1936 and 1941. Farmstead #1 includes the earliest buildings, dated to about 1841. Farmstead #2 includes a Shingle Style dwelling designed by architect John A. Dempwolf and built about 1893. Farmstead #3 has a -story, banked Pennsylvania German dwelling built about 1845. Farmstead #4 has a -story, banked Georgian-plan dwelling built about 1845. The Radio Broadcast Complex includes a -story, brick Colonial Revival-style office building and four radio towers, and used as a radio station from the 1940s until 1990.

It was listed on the National Register of Historic Places in 2000.

References 

Buildings and structures in York County, Pennsylvania
Colonial Revival architecture in Pennsylvania
Farms on the National Register of Historic Places in Pennsylvania
Historic districts on the National Register of Historic Places in Pennsylvania
Houses in York County, Pennsylvania
National Register of Historic Places in York County, Pennsylvania
Shingle Style architecture in Pennsylvania